The Free Souls Motorcycle Club are an outlaw motorcycle club that was formed in Eugene, Oregon in 1969.
Chapters exist in Oregon, Washington State and Germany. The club's center patch consists of an ankh over a motorcycle wheel which is itself over a set of motorcycle handlebars. The club colors are blue and white. Blue and White is a metonym for the club.

References

External links

1969 establishments in Oregon
Outlaw motorcycle clubs
Gangs in Oregon
Organizations based in Eugene, Oregon
Motorcycle clubs in the United States